JS Kirisame (DD-104) is the fourth ship of s of the Japan Maritime Self-Defense Force (JMSDF). She was commissioned on 18 March 1999.

Design
The hull design was completely renovated from first-generation destroyers. In addition to increasing the size in order to reduce the underwater radiation noise, both the superstructure and hull were inclined to reduce the radar cross-section. However, there is no angled tripod mainmast like the one of the American  because of the heavy weather of the Sea of Japan in winter. Destroyers built under the First Defense Build-up Plan, including the former , adopted a unique long forecastle style called "Oranda-zaka".

The engine arrangement is COGAG as in the Asagiri class, but a pair of engines were updated to Spey SM1C. The remaining pair were replaced by LM2500, as in the Kongō class.

Construction and career
Kirisame was laid down on 3 April 1996 at Mitsubishi Heavy Industries Nagasaki as the 1994 plan and launched on 21 August 1997. Commissioned on 18 March 1999, was incorporated into the 6th Escort Corps of the 2nd Escort Corps and deployed to Sasebo.

On 10 May 2020, he departed from Sasebo base for the Middle East as the second dispatch information gathering activity water squadron. On 26 October, the same year, the vessel returned to Sasebo base.

Gallery

Citations

References 

 
 
 Saunders, Stephen. IHS Jane's Fighting Ships 2013-2014. Jane's Information Group (2003). 

1997 ships
Murasame-class destroyers (1994)
Ships built by Mitsubishi Heavy Industries